Grindelia buphthalmoides is a species of flowering plants in the family Asteraceae found in Brazil, Uruguay, and Argentina, classified by Augustin Pyramus de Candolle in 1836.

References

 

buphthalmoides
Plants described in 1836